Seed Lake is a 240-acre (0.97 km²) reservoir with 13 miles (21 km) of shoreline located in Rabun County, in the northeastern corner of Georgia, United States. It is the second lake in a series of six lakes that follow the original riverbed of the Tallulah River.  Each lake in the chain is created by hydroelectric dams operated by Georgia Power.  Lake Seed is sandwiched between the northernmost lake in the series, Lake Burton, and Lake Rabun.  Lake Rabun is followed by Lake Tallulah Falls, Lake Tugalo, and Lake Yonah.  The reservoir elevation is listed as 1,765 feet on topographic maps, but Georgia Power considers the lake full at an elevation of 1,752.5 feet.

Seed Lake was formed in 1927 with the completion of the Nacoochee Dam, a gravity concrete and masonry dam that is 75 feet high and spans 490 feet.  The associated Nacoochee Hydroelectric Plant has a capacity of 4,800 kilowatts.  Nacoochee is derived from the Cherokee word that means "evening star."

Sources
Georgia Power Website
North Georgia Lakes on About North Georgia
TopoQuest Map of Lake Seed
Georgia Power lake levels

Seed
Protected areas of Rabun County, Georgia
Seed
Georgia Power dams
Bodies of water of Rabun County, Georgia